Nikos Sevastopoulos (born 26 February 1945) is a former Greek professional footballer who played as a forward. His nickname was "The Greek Pelé" due to his football skills and the dark colour of his skin.

Club career

Early career
Sevastopoulos from a young age was involved in football, playing with his peers in the arenas of Tavros. At the age of just 11 in 1956, he joined the local Panthisaikos, where he stayed for a competitive season. Afterwards, he was tested in the youth departments of AEK Athens by the people in charge there, Christos Ribas and Georgios Daispangos. Both were stunned by the talent and abilities of the 12-year-old Sevastopoulos and immediately enrolled him in the academies of the club, where he continuously participated as a key player in the teams of his age. In 1963, he got to compete in the AEK Youth team with which he was crowned Champion, alongside the conquest of the Greek Championship by the men's team, while he is already playing as a key player in the Youth National Team.

AEK Athens
In the summer of 1963, Heinrich Müller promoted him to the first team and on 13 October 1963, he made his debut in a 0–0 away draw against Iraklis. However, his refusal to the proposal of Kleanthis Maropoulos to work as an employee in the sporting goods store he maintained alongside Tryfon Tzanetis put him out of favor. Maropoulos, selector of the national team and General Manager of AEK, removed him from the men's team and sent him in the Youth team, which frustrated Sevastopoulos. His disappointment made him provocative on the pitch and in a match against Ethnikos Piraeus he engaged in a fight with his opponent, Chatziioannidis, after a hard tackle and was punished with a four month-ban.

During this period, the president of Hellenic from Cape Town came to Greece with the task of rejoining to his club the player of Fostiras, Deimezis. Deimezis refused and as he was looking for a replacement, he found Sevastopoulos who was punished and could not compete in Greece, while the absence of the professional South African League from FIFA gave the opportunity for such a move. Sevastopoulos went to Cape Town initially for four months but his spell eventually reached nine months. During his stay there, the team arranged a friendly against the Real Madrid with players such as Ferenc Puskás, Amancio Amaro, Francisco Gento and Pirri. They lost by 4–0, but Sevastopoulos impressed the people of Real Madrid who arranged through their coach for him to visit Madrid the following year to be tested by the "Queen". However his trip to Spain never happened. as in December 1964 he returned to Greece to do his military service.

His spell in South Africa increased the spite of Maropoulos towards him and his sideline from AEK, as long as his term in the army lasted, was at total. In April 1967 after was dismissed from, he left for South Africa again planning a permanent stay. However, the Coup d'état of 21 April and the consolidation of the military dictatorship which resulted in the removal of Maropoulos as the selector of the national team and with the delay in the process of issuing a green card for his stay in the country and after months of waiting in Zimbabwe and Zambia, he returned to Greece in the summer 1968.

The manager of the yellow-blacks at the time was Branko Stanković, who impressed by his football skills, gave him a place in the squad. He quickly became part of the main squad and was one of their main players in their course to the quarter-finals of the European Cup, scoring in the first quarter-final against Spartak Trnava at Spartak Stadium on 26 February 1969, the day he celebrated his 24th birthday. The difficulty in the payments of the players on the part of the then management caused a new reaction by Sevastopoulos who again sought to leave for Cape Town. The junta commissioner who had been placed by the regime in the club initially withheld his passport, preventing him until April 1969. Then he managed to leave and remained in South Africa until the September of the same year. His return to Nea Filadelfeia was met with closed doors. Stanković had realized that he was dealing with an unprofessional and undisciplined footballer and despite his stunning performances, he terminated his contract with the club.

Later career
He continued his career at Vyzas Megara. In the summer 1974 he decided traveled to Canada to play with Toronto Homer, under the name "Gus Hatoupis". In 1975, he was acquired by league rivals Windsor Stars where he appeared in eight matches. He was shortly released by Windsor as the Ontario Soccer Association notified the club over the confusion of his playing name. In 1976, he signed with Toronto Metros-Croatia of the North American Soccer League, where he had the chance to play alongside Eusébio and made three appearances. Throughout his short tenure with Toronto he was deemed as an ineligible player by the Canadian Soccer Association as he was registered under his legal name, which caused a problem with the HFF, as he failed to get permission to play abroad. After the impeachment of Vyzas to FIFA, he returned back to the club of Megara, where he played until 1981 when he retired, at the age of 36.

International career
Sevastopoulos played for Greece U19 4 times for the qualifiers and the group stage of the European Championship in 1963. He scored his only goal in the 7–2 triumph over West Germany at home, on 13 April.

Personal life
Since 1974, Sevastopoulos started working as a bartender at the Hilton Hotel of Athens, alongside his football obligations at Vyzas Magara. He stayed at the Hilton bar until 1997, without missing a break in between, traveling to Canada or Brazil to compete in 5X5 or 6X6 football tournaments with famous veterans from abroad. He later worked in a cosmetics company with his wife.

References

1945 births
Living people
AEK Athens F.C. players
Hellenic F.C. players
Vyzas F.C. players
Greece international footballers
Super League Greece players
Association football forwards
Footballers from Athens
Greek footballers
Toronto Blizzard (1971–1984) players
Canadian National Soccer League players
North American Soccer League (1968–1984) players
Greek expatriate sportspeople in Canada
Expatriate soccer players in Canada